Anke Huber was the defending champion but lost in the semifinals to Jana Novotná.

Novotná won in the final 6–2, 4–6, 6–3 against Amanda Coetzer.

Seeds
A champion seed is indicated in bold text while text in italics indicates the round in which that seed was eliminated. The top four seeds received a bye to the second round.

  Martina Hingis (semifinals)
  Jana Novotná (champion)
  Iva Majoli (quarterfinals)
  Amanda Coetzer (final)
  Anke Huber (semifinals)
  Barbara Paulus (second round)
  Sabine Appelmans (quarterfinals)
  Yayuk Basuki (second round)

Draw

Final

Section 1

Section 2

External links
1997 Sparkassen Cup draw

Sparkassen Cup (tennis)
1997 WTA Tour